The Gambler Wore a Gun is a 1961 Western film. The film is an uncredited remake of about five different B-westerns of the 1930s and 1940s. Some plot elements are also taken from 1954 western The Lone Gun, which starred George Montgomery.

Plot

Case Silverhorn (Jim Davis), a professional gambler, wants to retire from the gambling life and purchases a ranch through the mail. On the way there he saves the local Sheriff's life, who got into an ambush. The ambush did leave one man dead: the man Silverhorn purchased the ranch from is murdered before the title-deed can be recorded. Neither the Sheriff, nor the seller's children, Jud (Don Dorrell) and Sharon Donovan (Merry Anders) have any knowledge of the transaction and will not vacate the ranch. Taking a job at the local saloon, Case discovers that rustlers, unknown to the Donovans, are using the ranch-lands to hide the stolen cattle. Jud learns of the operation and is killed by the gang, and Case is framed for the murder.

See also
 List of American films of 1961

References

External links

1961 films
1960s English-language films
American black-and-white films
American Western (genre) films
1961 Western (genre) films
Films directed by Edward L. Cahn
United Artists films
1960s American films